Mark Christensen may refer to:
 Mark B. Christensen, label owner and mastering engineer
 Mark R. Christensen (born 1962), Nebraska state senator
 Mark Christensen (basketball) (born 1955), American basketball player
 Mark Christensen (rugby league) (born 1982), Australian rugby league player 
 Mark Christensen (soccer) (born 1960), American soccer player
 Mark Christensen, filmmaker known for films such as Box Head Revolution
 Mark Christensen, competitor in the Transpacific Yacht Race

See also
 Mark Christiansen (born 1963), retired badminton player from Denmark